Berżniki , is a village in the administrative district of Gmina Sejny, within Sejny County, Podlaskie Voivodeship, in north-eastern Poland, close to the border with Lithuania.

The village has a population of 320.

History

Berżniki was granted town rights by Queen of Poland Bona Sforza in 1551. It lost its town rights after 1810. In 1827 it had a population of 464, and in the late 19th century it was inhabited by 729 people.

During the German occupation (World War II), the Germans arrested the local Polish parish priest Józef Śledziński in April 1940 and then imprisoned him in Suwałki and the Soldau and Sachsenhausen concentration camps. He died after being beaten by the Germans in Sachsenhausen in August 1940 (see Nazi crimes against the Polish nation). Works of art and vital records were looted by the Germans from the local church and taken to Königsberg.

References

Villages in Sejny County
Białystok Voivodeship (1919–1939)